Acacia euthycarpa is a shrub or small tree species that is endemic to southern Australia. It shares its common names of wallowa or reed-leaf wattle with a similar species Acacia calamifolia. It usually grows as a shrub to between 2 and 4 metres high, but certain forms may be small trees up to 10 metres high.  The linear phyllodes are up to 10 cm long, dull green or grey green and have sharply pointed hooked tips. The globular golden flowerheads appear in 2-4 headed racemes between August and October, followed by curved seedpods that are up to 15 cm long.

The taxon was first formally described by botanist John McConnell Black in Transactions of the Royal Society of South Australia  in 1923 as Acacia calamifolia var. euthycarpa. It was subsequently promoted to species status by Black in 1945. It occurs from Mount Finke in South Australia and eastward to north-western Victoria.

The species is a food plant for larvae of the Icilius blue butterfly.

References

euthycarpa
Flora of South Australia
Flora of Victoria (Australia)
Fabales of Australia
Taxa named by John McConnell Black